Vadim Laliev (born 12 December 1980) is a retired Ossetian Freestyle wrestler. He joined the Russian national wrestling team in 1999 and switched to the Armenian national wrestling team in 2006. Laliev won a bronze medal at the European Wrestling Championships twice, in 2003 representing Russia and in 2006 representing Armenia. He is the younger brother of Olympic silver medalist Gennadiy Laliev.

References

1980 births
Living people
Ossetian people
Armenian male sport wrestlers
Russian male sport wrestlers
European Wrestling Championships medalists